"When" is a popular song written by Jack Reardon and Paul Evans and published in 1958.

The Kalin Twins version
The biggest hit version was recorded by The Kalin Twins in 1958, a chart-topper in the UK Singles Chart for five weeks, No. 2 in Canada, and No. 5 in the US Billboard Hot 100. In French 1958 single charts it spent 18 weeks as number 1, and in the Netherlands the song charted for 30 weeks and was also a number one for 5 weeks.

Cover versions
In 1958, a German version of "When" was recorded as "Wenn" by German Schlager music group Die James Brothers.

In 1977, Showaddywaddy had a UK No. 3 hit with the song.

The song was revived in 2004 by Daniel O'Donnell in his album of songs from the 1950s and 1960s, The Jukebox Years.

See also
List of UK Singles Chart number ones of the 1950s

References

1958 songs
1958 singles
1977 singles
Kalin Twins songs
Showaddywaddy songs
Number-one singles in Australia
UK Singles Chart number-one singles
Songs written by Paul Evans (musician)
Brunswick Records singles
Arista Records singles
Song recordings produced by Mike Hurst (producer)